District 3 of the Georgia Senate is a senatorial district that is in the southeast coast of Brunswick, Georgia. Its current senator is Sheila McNeill.

State Senators 
William T. Ligon Jr., January 10, 2011 – January 10, 2021
Sheila McNeill, January 11, 2021 – Present

References
http://www.senate.ga.gov/senators/en-US/District.aspx?District=3&Session=27

External links

Government of Georgia (U.S. state)
Georgia Senate districts